Jeff Meacham (born April 4,  1979) is an American actor best known for his role in the television comedy series Black-ish and The Thundermans.

Early life
Meacham attended Booker High School in Sarasota, Florida.

Career
After graduating from Booker's performing arts school in 1997, Meacham played a variety of minor roles in productions including Guiding Light and Ugly Betty. In 2006, Meacham was featured in an internet-only ad campaign for a shaving system. After the commercial, in which he played the "Shave Everywhere Guy", went viral, Meacham began to receive interest from agents. Most notably, Meacham has been featured in the role of Josh Oppenhol in the comedy Black-ish, and a recurring role as Principal Bradford in the Nickelodeon series The Thundermans In addition, Meacham has played the role of Fred Flaterman on Resident Advisors.
In 2018, Meacham was nominated for the Screen Actors Guild Award for Outstanding Performance by an Ensemble in a Comedy Series. Meacham graduated from Purchase College's Acting Conservatory in 2001.

Meacham advocates for paid family leave and affordable childcare through Make it Work.

Personal life
Meacham is married to actress Christy Meyers.

Filmography

Film

Television

References

External links
 

1979 births
20th-century American male actors
21st-century American male actors
American male television actors
Living people
Place of birth missing (living people)